Gosnell School District (officially: Gosnell School District No. 6) is a public school district based in Gosnell, Arkansas, United States. The Gosnell School District provides early childhood, elementary and secondary education for more than 1,400 prekindergarten through grade 12 students at its two facilities within Mississippi County, Arkansas.

It serves Gosnell and Dell as well as portions of Blytheville.

Gosnell School District is accredited by the Arkansas Department of Education (ADE) and AdvancED.

History
On July 1, 1984, the Dell School District merged into the Gosnell School District.

Schools 
 Gosnell High School—serving more than 650 students in grades 7 through 12.
 Gosnell Elementary School—serving more than 750 students in pre-kindergarten through grade 6.

References

External links 

 
School districts in Arkansas
Education in Mississippi County, Arkansas